New Zealand political leader Robert Muldoon assembled a "shadow cabinet" within the National Party caucus after his transition to the position of Leader of the Opposition in 1984 following National's defeat at the 1984 election. He composed this of individuals who acted for the party as spokespeople in assigned roles while he was Leader of the Opposition.

As the National Party formed the largest party not in government at the time, the frontbench team was as a result the Official Opposition within the New Zealand House of Representatives.

Robert Muldoon's shadow cabinet lasted for only four months, ending when he was replaced as Leader of the National Party by his deputy, Jim McLay, in November 1984.

Frontbench team
The list below contains a list of Muldoon's shadow ministers and their respective roles.

Notes

References

New Zealand National Party
Muldoon, Robert
1984 establishments in New Zealand
1984 disestablishments in New Zealand